Kyadigera is a village in Devadurga taluk of Raichur district in the Indian state of Karnataka. Kyadigera was part of Shorapur kingdom and has an ancient fort. Kyadigera lies between Sirwar and Arakera.

Demographics
 India census, Kyadigera had a population of 5209 with 2647 males and 2562 females.

Transport
Kyadigera can be reached from Devadurga, Raichur and Shorapur. Nearest major railway station is in Raichur.

See also
 Devadurga
 Lingasugur
 Shorapur
 Raichur
 Districts of Karnataka

References

External links
 http://Raichur.nic.in/

Villages in Raichur district
Archaeological sites in Karnataka